The 1964 CONCACAF Champions' Cup was the edition of the annual international club football competition held in the CONCACAF region (North America, Central America and the Caribbean), the CONCACAF Champions' Cup. It determined that year's club champion of association football in the CONCACAF region.

The tournament was played by 11 teams of 10 nations: Mexico, United States, Costa Rica, El Salvador, Guatemala, Honduras, Netherlands Antilles, Haiti, Dutch Guiana, Trinidad and Tobago. The tournament was played from 20 September till 15 December 1964.

The teams were split in 3 zones (North American, Central American and Caribbean), each one qualifying the winner to the final tournament, where the winners of the North and Central zones played a semi-final to decide who was going to play against the Caribbean champion in the final. All the matches in the tournament were played under the home/away match system.

No champion was crowned as the final of the tournament could not be held: the tournament was declared void.

North American Zone

First round

Both teams left the tournament for unknown reasons.

Second round

Guadalajara had no opponent so he left the tournament.

Central American Zone

First round

Second round

Caribbean Zone

First round

Second round

Final

Both teams withdrew from the tournament.

References

1
CONCACAF Champions' Cup